Emperor Wu or the Wu Emperor (lit. "The Martial Emperor") is the posthumous name of numerous Chinese rulers:

Emperor Wu of Han (156–87 BC), emperor of the Han dynasty 
Emperor Wu of Wei (AD 155–220), a posthumous name of Cao Cao
Emperor Wu of Jin (236–290), first emperor of the Jin dynasty
Emperor Wu of Liu Song (363–422), founding emperor of the Chinese dynasty Liu Song
Emperor Wu of Southern Qi (440–493), emperor of the Chinese Southern Qi Dynasty
Emperor Wu of Liang (464–549), founding emperor of the Liang Dynasty of Chinese history
Emperor Wu of Chen (503–559), first emperor of the Chen dynasty of China
Emperor Wu of Northern Zhou (543–578), an emperor of the Xianbei dynasty Northern Zhou
Empress Wu Zetian (625–705), from her actual surname rather than a posthumous epithet

Emperor of Wu may refer to:
Li Zitong (died 622), agrarian rebel during the Sui–Tang interregnum

See also
 Cao Cao (155–220), posthumously honored as the King Wu of Wei
 Wudi (disambiguation)
 Wu Di (disambiguation)
 Wu (disambiguation)

Title and name disambiguation pages